The Poker Players Championship is a $50,000 buy-in event at the World Series of Poker (WSOP). Added in the 2010, it replaced the former $50,000 H.O.R.S.E. World Championship as the highest-stakes mixed-games event. It is considered among the most prestigious events on offer at the WSOP.

History
In 2006, the inaugural event was called the $50,000 H.O.R.S.E. World Championship and was the largest buy-in tournament at the World Series of Poker until the introduction of the $1,000,000 Big One for One Drop in 2012. Chip Reese defeated Andy Bloch heads-up the in the 2006 H.O.R.S.E. World Championship to win $1,784,640 and the event's first title.

In 2007, professional poker player Freddy Deeb defeated Bruno Fitoussi after 17 hours of final table play to win $2,276,832 and his second bracelet. Chip Reese died in December 2007; efforts were made in 2008 to honor Reese by the WSOP which created the Chip Reese memorial trophy that each champion can hold for one year. Scotty Nguyen won the 2008 tournament and received the trophy. Controversy ensued when Nguyen, intoxicated during the final table of the tournament, began berating other players, notably Michael DeMichele, without receiving any penalty.

In 2010, $50,000 H.O.R.S.E. World Championship changed to the Poker Player's Championship and became the first 8-game mix version of the event. In 2015, the Poker Players Championship changed to a 10-game mix format. Unlike the previous five-game rotation of H.O.R.S.E. and the eight-game rotation that followed, the 10-game mix consisted of limit 2–7 triple draw lowball, limit Texas hold'em, limit Omaha/8B, limit razz, limit seven-card stud, limit seven card stud/8B, no-limit Texas hold'em with antes, pot-limit Omaha, badugi, and 2–7 no-limit draw lowball. The final table was played out exclusively in no-limit Texas hold'em in 2010 and 2011 to appeal to television viewers. The event has not televised since and has been played out in a mixed-game format for its entire duration. After declining turnout for the 10-game version in 2015, the tournament reverted to the previous 8-game format and remained that way until 2021.  In 2021, no-limit 2-7 lowball draw was added back to make the tournament a 9-game mix.

Michael Mizrachi became the first two-time champion after winning the event in 2010 and 2012, earning him $1,559,046 and $1,451,527 respectively. Brian Rast became the second two-time champion after winning the event in 2011 and 2016, earning him $1,720,328 and $1,296,097 respectively. Daniel Cates became the third two-time champion, and first person to win the event in consecutive years after winning the event in 2021 and 2022, earning him $954,020 and $1,449,103 respectively.

At the 2018 WSOP, Mizrachi won the event for a record third time, defeating 2014 champion John Hennigan heads up and winning $1,239,126.

Winners

References

World Series of Poker
Poker tournaments